This is a list of electoral results for the Electoral district of West Perth in Western Australian state elections.

Members for West Perth

Election results

Elections in the 1950s

 Two party preferred vote was estimated.

Elections in the 1940s

Elections in the 1930s

Elections in the 1920s

Elections in the 1910s

Elections in the 1900s

Elections in the 1890s

References

Western Australian state electoral results by district